Yongsheng Road (Chinese: 永盛路) is a metro station on Line 7 and Line 19 of Hangzhou Metro in China. Opened on 30 December 2020, it is located in Xiaoshan District of Hangzhou.

References 

Hangzhou Metro stations
Railway stations in China opened in 2020